The individual BC2 boccia event at the 2012 Summer Paralympics was contested from 5 to 8 September at ExCeL London.

Seeding matches 

Two preliminary matches were held to determine the participants' seed for the tournament bracket.

Draw

Finals

5th–8th place matches

Top half

Bottom half

Final ranking

References 

 

Individual BC2